Myophiomyidae is an extinct family of Old World hystricognaths.

References

 
Hystricognath rodents
Prehistoric rodent families
Taxa named by René Lavocat
Rupelian first appearances
Miocene extinctions